NGC 6169 is an open cluster in the constellation Norma. It is 3280 light-years distant and thought to be around 32 million years old.

References

NGC 6169
6169
Norma (constellation)